Peter Hanning (9 April 1945 - 18 May 2015) was the Connétable of the Parish of St Saviour, in Jersey, from 2007 until 2011.

Biography
Hanning was born on 9 April 1945, in Jersey.

He was educated at Victoria College, Jersey, and Brixton School of Building before joining the family firm, F. Hanning & Son Ltd, Decorators.

He was elected three times to the board of the Jersey Mutual Insurance Society and was its president in 2001.

He was a keen yachtsman and from 1996–1997 was Commodore of St Helier Yacht Club, Jersey. He was also a life member of the Royal Channel Island Yacht Club, a national sailing judge, national match race umpire and regional race officer.

He was a former Jersey Squash Racquets Association secretary, coach, umpire and referee.

Political career
On 24 August 2007, Hanning was sworn-in as Connétable of St Saviour in the Royal Court of Jersey. As Connétable, he represented the parish in the States of Jersey. He was nominated to the States of Jersey Planning Applications Panel.

Honorary Service in the Parish of St Saviour 
1974 - 2000 Joined the Honorary Police as a St Saviour Constable's Officer
1984 - 1993 Member of the St Saviour Rate Assessment Committee
1993 - 2007 Chairman of St Saviour Rate Assessment Committee
1998 - 2003 Chairman of the Island Association of Rate Assessors and worked on numerous rating sub-committees, including a States Working Party to bring forward the new Rating Law.
2007 - Elected Connétable of the Parish of St Saviour in the Constable Election in 2007

References

External links
Parish of St Saviour

Constables of Jersey
People educated at Victoria College, Jersey
Living people
1945 births
Alumni of London South Bank University